Westside Medical is an American medical drama that aired from March 17 until August 25, 1977.

Premise
The series is about three young doctors working at a clinic in Southern California.

Cast
James Sloyan as Dr. Sam Lanagan
Linda Carlson as Dr. Janet Cottrell
Ernest Thompson as Dr. Phil Barker
Alice Nunn as Carrie

Episodes

References

External links
IMDb
TV.com
TV Guide

1977 American television series debuts
1977 American television series endings
1970s American medical television series
English-language television shows
American Broadcasting Company original programming
Television shows set in California